Suriya Singmui (born 7 April 1995) is a Thai professional footballer who can play as a left back for Thai League 1 club Chiangrai United and the Thailand national team.

Career

Muangthong United
He is playing for JMG Academy and Muangthong United for 6 years.

Nakhon Nayok
He went out on loan to Nakhon Nayok in March 2013, which was extended for the duration of the 2013–14 season in Thai Division 2. In all he made over 32 first team appearances for Nakhon Nayok.

Return to Muangthong United
He played his first match  in 2014 AFC Champions League qualifying play-off against Hà Nội T&T and won this match with a score of 2-0. Next round with a score of in a 2-1 his side loss against Melbourne Victory.

He debuts in 2014 Thai Premier League against Chainat Hornbill.

He was relianced by Scott Cooper to playing in 2014 Thai Premier League.

Personal life
Suriya is one of the few Christian footballers in Thailand.

International career
He represented Thailand U23 in the 2014 Asian Games. Suriya won the 2015 Southeast Asian Games with Thailand U23. In 2016 Suriya was selected in Thailand U23 squad for 2016 AFC U-23 Championship in Qatar.

International

Honours

Club
Chiangrai United
 Thai League 1 (1): 2019
 Thai FA Cup (3): 2017, 2018, 2020–21
 Thailand Champions Cup (2): 2018, 2020
 Thai League Cup (1): 2018

International
Thailand
 AFF Championship (1): 2020
Thailand U-23
 Sea Games
  Gold Medal (2); 2015, 2017
 Nations Cup (1): 2016
 Dubai Cup (1):  2017

References

External links
 Profile at Goal.com
 
 

1995 births
Living people
Suriya Singmui
Suriya Singmui
Suriya Singmui
Suriya Singmui
Association football fullbacks
Suriya Singmui
Suriya Singmui
Suriya Singmui
Suriya Singmui
Footballers at the 2014 Asian Games
Suriya Singmui
Southeast Asian Games medalists in football
Suriya Singmui
Footballers at the 2018 Asian Games
Competitors at the 2015 Southeast Asian Games
Competitors at the 2017 Southeast Asian Games
Suriya Singmui